This is a list of episodes for the fifth season (1990–91) of the television series Married... with Children.

In the middle of the fifth season, Marcy awakes next to Jefferson D'Arcy and discovers that she is now married to him. This is the first appearance of Al's favorite show (Psycho Dad), and the first mention of his four touchdowns in a single game.

Katey Sagal was absent for one episode. Amanda Bearse also missed two episodes.

Episodes

References

1990 American television seasons
1991 American television seasons
05